Mohamed Gelle Kahiye is a Somali military official.

Biography
Kahiye previously served as a colonel in the Somali National Army. After the start of the civil war in Somalia, he moved to Germany, where he worked as an assistant manager at McDonald's.

Kahiye subsequently returned to Somalia, and was appointed Chief of Army on 6 December 2009 by the Transitional Federal Government. He was later dismissed along with other top commanders on 6 September 2010.

References

Somalian military leaders
Living people
Somalian generals
Year of birth missing (living people)